Alleyne Jeremy Francique (born June 7, 1976) is a retired Grenadian athlete who specialized in 400 metres, his personal best being 44.47 seconds set in 2004. He is the 400m two time world indoor champion in 2004 and 2006.

He won his first world-level medal in 2003, when he finished third in the first World Athletics Final in 45.25 s. He had won a 400 metres gold medal and finished fifth in 4x400 metres relay at the 2003 Central American and Caribbean Championships.

The next year he won the gold medal at the World Indoor Championships, achieving the result 45.88 s. Later that year he competed in 400 metres at the 2004 Summer Olympics, and finished fourth with 44.66 s.

In the 2005 World Championships in Helsinki, he competed in 400 metres but only reached the semi finals, running 46.59 s which is far above his personal best. In 2006, however, he defended his title at the World Indoor Championships with 45.54 s. In March the same year he won a silver medal at the 2006 Commonwealth Games. He then finished sixth at the World Athletics Final and fourth at the World Cup.

Francique ran track collegiately at Louisiana State University.

Competition record

References
 
 

1976 births
Living people
Grenadian male sprinters
Athletes (track and field) at the 1996 Summer Olympics
Athletes (track and field) at the 2004 Summer Olympics
Athletes (track and field) at the 2008 Summer Olympics
Olympic athletes of Grenada
Athletes (track and field) at the 2002 Commonwealth Games
Athletes (track and field) at the 2006 Commonwealth Games
Athletes (track and field) at the 1999 Pan American Games
Athletes (track and field) at the 2003 Pan American Games
Athletes (track and field) at the 2007 Pan American Games
Commonwealth Games silver medallists for Grenada
Pan American Games medalists in athletics (track and field)
LSU Tigers track and field athletes
People from Saint Andrew Parish, Grenada
Commonwealth Games medallists in athletics
Pan American Games bronze medalists for Grenada
Central American and Caribbean Games silver medalists for Grenada
Competitors at the 2006 Central American and Caribbean Games
Texas A&M Aggies track and field coaches
World Athletics Indoor Championships winners
Central American and Caribbean Games medalists in athletics
Medalists at the 2003 Pan American Games
Medallists at the 2006 Commonwealth Games